A multi-tape Turing machine is a variant of the Turing machine that utilizes several tapes. Each tape has its own head for reading and writing. Initially, the input appears on tape 1, and the others start out blank.

This model intuitively seems much more powerful than the single-tape model, but any multi-tape machine—no matter how many tapes—can be simulated by a single-tape machine using only quadratically more computation time. Thus, multi-tape machines cannot calculate any more functions than single-tape machines, and none of the robust complexity classes (such as polynomial time) are affected by a change between single-tape and multi-tape machines.

Formal definition 
-tape Turing machine can be formally defined as a 7-tuple , following the notation of a Turing machine:
  is a finite, non-empty set of tape alphabet symbols;
  is the blank symbol (the only symbol allowed to occur on the tape infinitely often at any step during the computation);
  is the set of input symbols, that is, the set of symbols allowed to appear in the initial tape contents;
  is a finite, non-empty set of states;
  is the initial state;
  is the set of final states or accepting states.
  is a partial function called the transition function, where L is left shift, R is right shift. 

A -tape Turing machine  computes as follows. Initially,  receives its input  on the leftmost  positions of the first tape, the rest of the first tape as well as other tapes is blank (i.e., filled with blank symbols). All the heads start on the leftmost position of the tapes. Once  has started, the computation proceeds according to the rules described by the transition function. The computation continues until it enters the accept states, at which point it halts.

Two-stack Turing machine 
Two-stack Turing machines have a read-only input and two storage tapes. If a head moves left on either tape a blank is printed on that tape, but one symbol from a "library" can be printed.

See also 
 Turing machine
 Universal Turing machine
 Alternating Turing machine
 Probabilistic Turing machine
 Turing machine equivalents

References 

Turing machine